Kokona Iwasaki (born 8 October 2002) is a Japanese professional footballer who plays as a midfielder for WE League club Tokyo Verdy Beleza.

Club career 
Iwasaki made her WE League debut on 25 September 2021.

References 

Japanese women's footballers
2002 births
Living people
Nippon TV Tokyo Verdy Beleza players
Women's association football midfielders
Association football people from Saitama Prefecture
WE League players